Palatine canal may refer to:

 Greater palatine canal
 Lesser palatine canals